Actidium is a genus of fungi in the family Mytilinidiaceae.

References

External links 
 Index Fungorum

Mytilinidiales
Dothideomycetes genera